John Smith (6 September 1767 – 20 January 1842) was a British politician who sat in the House of Commons from 1806 to 1835 and a banker.

Biography

Early life

John Smith was born on 6 September 1767. He was the sixth son of Abel Smith II (1717-1788), a Nottingham banker who was a Member of Parliament for Aldborough, St Ives, and St Germans, and the brother of Robert Smith, 1st Baron Carrington. He lived at Blendon Hall in Kent and finally at Dale Park in Sussex. There is a fine memorial to him in Chichester Cathedral, comprising his recumbent effigy atop a chest tomb set within a gothic-arched niche.

Career
He served as a Tory Member of Parliament for Wendover from 1802 to 1806 and later represented Nottingham from 1806 to 1818, Midhurst from 1818 to 1830, Chichester from 1830 to 1831, and Buckinghamshire from 1831 to 1835. (He was also elected for Midhurst in 1806, but preferred to sit for Nottingham on that occasion. Both Wendover and Midhurst were pocket boroughs controlled by his brother Lord Carrington, but the competitive Nottingham constituency was considerably more prestigious.) Between 1800 and 1831 when pocket boroughs were abolished 12 members of the Smith family sat for the Midhurst parliamentary seat alone. In 1806, Smith served as a Manager of the newly formed London Institution.

Personal life and death
He married three times. By his second wife, Mary Tucker (1773–1809), he had two sons, John Abel Smith (1802–1871), who succeeded him as MP for Midhurst, and Martin Tucker Smith (1803–1890), who became MP for Wycombe; and he had two daughters by his third wife, Emma Leigh, including the writer, Caroline Leigh Gascoigne. He died on 20 January 1842 at Dale Park when he was accidentally poisoned by his nearly-blind wife, who gave him an overdose of laudanum.

His great-grandson Vivian Smith was created Baron Bicester in 1938.

References

 thePeerage.com – John Smith

External links 
 

1767 births
1842 deaths
Conservative Party (UK) MPs for English constituencies
UK MPs 1802–1806
UK MPs 1806–1807
UK MPs 1807–1812
UK MPs 1812–1818
UK MPs 1818–1820
UK MPs 1820–1826
UK MPs 1826–1830
UK MPs 1830–1831
UK MPs 1831–1832
UK MPs 1832–1835
John
Tory MPs (pre-1834)
Committee members of the Society for the Diffusion of Useful Knowledge